is an infill railway station on the Sanyō Main Line, Kabe Line, and the Astram Line in Naka-ku, Hiroshima, Japan. It is operated by West Japan Railway Company and Hiroshima Rapid Transit.

Lines
Shin-Hakushima Station is served by the following lines:
 
  Sanyo Main Line
  Kabe Line
 Hiroshima Rapid Transit

Station layout

JR West

The JR West station consists of two staggered side platforms serving two tracks. Each platform is accessed through a separate station building. A convenience store is located in the westbound ticket hall. Outside the ticket barriers, there is an underpass connecting the two buildings. A dedicated walkway connects the JR West and Astram Line stations.

Platforms

Adjacent stations

Astram Line

The Astram Line station has 1 island platform serving two tracks. The platform forms a triangular shape, with the station exit at the wide end of the platform. There is an emergency exit at the other end. To the north of the station, the track immediately leaves the tunnel, and becomes elevated track after passing under the JR West station.

Platforms

History
The station was built to allow a direct connection between the Astram Line and the Sanyo Main Line. Initial plans were to have a circular shell cover the entire passageway connecting the Astram Line and JR West stations. The contract for design was awarded to C+A Coelacanth and Associates in 2012, with a planned opening sometime in 2014. However, structural concerns caused the opening to be delayed by one year, and caused the circular shell to be cut back so it no longer covered the passageway. The station opened on 14 March 2015. A green roof was later installed in the passageway sometime during 2015.

References

Railway stations in Hiroshima Prefecture
Astram Line stations
Railway stations in Japan opened in 2015